Stanisław Arnold (20 December 1895 in Dąbrowa Górnicza – 3 November 1973 in Warszawa) was a Polish historian, professor of the University of Warsaw, member of the Polish Academy of Sciences, chief of Marksistowskie Zrzeszenie Historyków (Marxist Association of Historians).

Biography 
He was the son of Jan, director of a mine, and Romana née Bojanowski. In 1920 he defended his PhD thesis Władztwo biskupie na grodzie wolborskim w wieku XIII under supervision of Marceli Handelsman. Later he became an employee of the Warsaw University, with which he was connected until retirement in 1966. From 1924 to 1928 he was working as a history teacher at Gimnazjum im. Stefana Batorego in Warsaw.

Students 
His students were Artur Eisenbach, Zofia Kamieńska, Antonina Keckowa, Witold Kula, Janina Leskiewiczowa, Władysław Pałucki, Stanisław Piekarczyk, Zbigniew Świtalski, Maria Turlejska.

Selected publications 
 Możnowładztwo polskie w XI i XII wieku i jego podstawy gospodarczo-społeczne (1925)
 Terytoria plemienne w ustroju administracyjnym Polski piastowskiej (wiek XII-XIII) (1927)
 W sprawie ustroju plemiennego na ziemiach polskich (1928)
 Geografia historyczna, jej zasady i metody (1929)
 Rozwój handlu polskiego (1939)
 Geografia historyczna Polski (1951)
 Historia Polski od połowy XV wieku do roku 1795 (1953, with Kazimierz Piwarski and Jerzy Michalski)
 Podłoże gospodarczo-społeczne polskiego Odrodzenia (1953)

References

Bibliography 
 Biogramy uczonych polskich, Część I: Nauki społeczne, zeszyt 1: A-J, Wrocław 1983.

20th-century Polish historians
Polish male non-fiction writers
1895 births
1973 deaths
Academic staff of the University of Warsaw